The men's 800 metres at the 2004 Summer Olympics as part of the athletics program was held at the Athens Olympic Stadium from August 25 to 28. Seventy-two athletes from 58 nations competed. The event was won by Yuriy Borzakovskiy of Russia, the first medal for the nation in the event. Wilson Kipketer of Denmark became the 10th man to win a second medal in the 800 metres.

Summary

The first round had split a full roster of runners into nine heats with the first two gaining a direct qualification and then the next six fastest across all heats advancing to the semifinals. The top two runners in each of the three semifinal heats moved on directly to the final, and they were immediately joined by the next two fastest from any of the semifinals.

The final was tactical, like the previous several Olympics with most athletes running faster to qualify than they ran in the final.  Yuriy Borzakovskiy and Mouhssin Chehibi lagged significantly off the pace.  World champion Djabir Saïd-Guerni and 2004 world leader Wilfred Bungei battled for the lead, chased closely by Bungei's second cousin, world record holder Wilson Kipketer, Borzakovskiy and Chehibi joined the back of the pack.  It seemed like Borzakovskiy was reluctant to catch the leaders, then realized the pace was not too fast, with 50 metres before the end of the first lap, he noticeably accelerated from dead last to join the fight.   Mbulaeni Mulaudzi, who had lucked into the slowest qualifying time in the semi final round, ran comfortably in a box inside of Kipketer through 500 meters.  A lead group broke away on the backstretch.  Guerni fell back as the cousins battled for the lead through the final turn, with Mulaudzi a step back and Borzakovskiy the final athlete in the breakaway.  Coming off the turn, Kipketer pounced and took off for the finish in lane two. But the always fast closing Borzakovskiy came along the outside from 5 meters back to catch Kipketer 30 meters out.  Not giving up the fight, Mulaudzi pulled even with Kipketer.  Borzakovskiy held his hands up with a meter victory, while Mulaudzi out leaned Kipketer for silver.

Background

This was the 25th appearance of the event, which is one of 12 athletics events to have been held at every Summer Olympics. All of the finalists from 2000 returned except for the champion: silver medalist Wilson Kipketer of Denmark, bronze medalist Djabir Saïd-Guerni of Algeria, fourth-place finisher (and 1996 silver medalist) Hezekiél Sepeng of South Africa, fifth-place finisher André Bucher of Switzerland, sixth-place finisher Yuriy Borzakovskiy of Russia, seventh-place finisher Glody Dube of Botswana, and Andrea Longo of Italy, who had been disqualified in the final due to obstruction. The three latest world champions were Saïd-Guerni (2003), Bucher (2001), and Kipketer (1999, 1997, and 1995); Kipketer still held the world record. Borzakovskiy (2003 world runner-up) and Wilfred Bungei of Kenya (who held the #1 ranking) were also serious contenders for gold.

Bolivia, Bosnia and Herzegovina, Kazakhstan, Lithuania, Palestine, Turkmenistan, Ukraine, Uzbekistan, and Vietnam appeared in the event for the first time. Great Britain made its 24th appearance, most among all nations, having had no competitors in the event only in the 1904 Games in St. Louis.

Qualification

The qualification period for athletics was 1 January 2003 to 9 August 2004. For the men's 800 metres, each National Olympic Committee was permitted to enter up to three athletes that had run the race in 1:46.00 or faster during the qualification period. If an NOC had no athletes that qualified under that standard, one athlete that had run the race in 1:47.00 or faster could be entered. The maximum number of athletes per nation had been set at 3 since the 1930 Olympic Congress.

Competition format

The men's 800 metres had a much larger field (79 entered and 72 started, compared with 61 starters in 2000) but again used a three-round format, the most common format since 1912 though there had been variations. The "fastest loser" system introduced in 1964 was used for the first two rounds. There were nine first-round heats, each with 8 athletes; the top two runners in each heat as well as the next six fastest overall advanced to the semifinals. There were three semifinals with 8 athletes each (except that one had an extra runner due to an advancement by obstruction rule in the first round); the top two runners in each semifinal and the next two fastest overall advanced to the eight-man final.

Records

Prior to the competition, the existing World and Olympic records were as follows.

No new world or Olympic records were set during the competition. The following national records were established during the competition:

Schedule

All times are Eastern European Summer Time (UTC+3)

Results

Round 1
Qualification rule: The first two finishers in each heat (Q) plus the next six fastest overall runners (q) advanced to the semifinals.

Heat 1

Heat 2

Heat 3

Heat 4

Heat 5

Heat 6

Heat 7

Heat 8

Heat 9

Semifinals
Qualification rule: The top two finishers in each heat (Q) plus the next two fastest overall runners (q) advanced to the final.

Semifinal 1

Semifinal 2

Semifinal 3

Final

References

External links
 IAAF Athens 2004 Olympic Coverage

M
800 metres at the Olympics
Men's events at the 2004 Summer Olympics